Buchanan County is a county located in the U.S. state of Iowa. As of the 2020 census, the population was 20,565. Its county seat is Independence. The county was created in 1837 and was named in honor of Senator James Buchanan, the 15th President of the United States.

History
Buchanan County was formed on December 21, 1837, from parts of Dubuque County. It was named after US Senator James Buchanan, who would later go on to be President of the United States.

Geography

Major highways
 Interstate 380
 U.S. Highway 20
 Iowa Highway 27
 Iowa Highway 150
 Iowa Highway 187
 Iowa Highway 281

Adjacent counties
Clayton County (northeast)
Fayette County (north)
Delaware County (east)
Linn County (southeast)
Benton County (southwest)
Black Hawk County (west)
Bremer County (northwest)

Demographics

2020 census
There were 8,886 housing units of which 8,198 were occupied.

2010 census
There were 8,968 housing units, of which 8,161 were occupied.

2000 census

As of the census of 2000, there were 21,093 people, 7,933 households, and 5,672 families residing in the county. The population density was 37 people per square mile (14/km2). There were 8,697 housing units at an average density of 15 per square mile (6/km2). The racial makeup of the county was 98.41% White, 0.27% Black or African American, 0.21% Native American, 0.40% Asian, 0.16% from other races, and 0.54% from two or more races. 0.62% of the population were Hispanic or Latino of any race.

There were 7,933 households, out of which 34.50% had children under the age of 18 living with them, 60.70% were married couples living together, 7.40% had a female householder with no husband present, and 28.50% were non-families. 24.70% of all households were made up of individuals, and 12.50% had someone living alone who was 65 years of age or older. The average household size was 2.61 and the average family size was 3.13.

In the county, the population was spread out, with 28.60% under the age of 18, 8.10% from 18 to 24, 26.30% from 25 to 44, 22.50% from 45 to 64, and 14.50% who were 65 years of age or older. The median age was 36 years. For every 100 females there were 98.70 males. For every 100 females age 18 and over, there were 94.40 males.

The median income for a household in the county was $38,036, and the median income for a family was $45,421. Males had a median income of $30,212 versus $22,356 for females. The per capita income for the county was $18,405. About 6.80% of families and 9.40% of the population were below the poverty line, including 12.90% of those under age 18 and 7.60% of those age 65 or over.

Communities

Cities

Aurora
Brandon
Fairbank
Hazleton
Independence
Jesup
Lamont
Quasqueton
Rowley
Stanley
Winthrop

Unincorporated communities

Bryantsburg
Doris
Gatesville
Littleton
Monti
Otterville
Shady Grove

A number of historic communities in Buchanan County once appeared on state maps, but no longer exist. Hamerville was located east of Brandon at the intersection of Highway 150. Today, the site is the location of three farmhouses. Vista, once located between Brandon and Independence, appeared on maps frequently until the 1950s. This site is not even accessed by paved road. Kier, between Fairbank and Littleton, appeared on many maps in the 19th century and early 20th century. The area is now settled by Amish. Several towns named Middlefield existed southeast of Winthrop, but none are populated today. Newtonville was located a few miles south of Monti. The houses at Castleville were later moved to Aurora. Wise, once located between Independence and Jesup just north of Highway 939, was a train-stop between the 1920s and the 1950s. Little remains at the site. Kiene was founded in 1911 between Quasqueton and Monti, but was empty by 1955. Few or even no houses remain at any of these sites.

Townships
Buchanan County is divided into sixteen townships:

 Buffalo
 Byron
 Cono
 Fairbank
 Fremont
 Hazleton
 Homer
 Jefferson
 Liberty
 Madison
 Middlefield
 Newton
 Perry
 Sumner
 Washington
 Westburg

Population ranking
The population ranking of the following table is based on the 2020 census of Buchanan County.

† county seat

Amish community
Buchanan County is home to the Hazleton Old Order Amish settlement, founded in 1914, that in 1987 had to six church districts (congregations) with an estimated population of about 1,200 Amish. The Buchanan Amish affiliation is named after Buchanan County.

Politics

Notable people

James "Jim" Smith, murdered Iowa State Trooper

See also

National Register of Historic Places listings in Buchanan County, Iowa

References

External links

Website for Buchanan County
Buchanan County Economic Development Commission's website

 
1837 establishments in Wisconsin Territory
Populated places established in 1837